A pen was a livestock farm on the Island of Jamaica. Pen-keeping included the breeding of cattle, horses, mules, sheep and dairy farming. Gardner (1873), referring to the 1750s, stated: "The life of a tolerably successful pen-keeper was at this period, as it is now, the most enviable to be found in the colony. Cattle thrive well, and few servants are required when once a pen is well established."

Batchelors Hall Pen was owned by Chaloner Arcedekne; it supplied Golden Grove Plantation, owned by the prominent Simon Taylor. Correspondence between the two men survives.

See also
List of plantations in Jamaica

References

Further reading
Shepherd, Verene A., The effects of the abolition of slavery on Jamaican livestock farms (pens), 1834–1845, 2008 
Shepherd, Verene A., Pens and pen-keepers in a plantation society: aspects of Jamaican social and economic history, 1740–1845, Ph.D. dissertation, University of Cambridge, 1988.
Carol Stiles, ''Vineyard: A Jamaican Cattle Pen, 1750–1751, A Thesis Presented to the Faculty of the Department of History, College of William and Mary in Virginia, in Partial Fulfillment of the Requirements for the Degree of Master of Arts, 1985 

History of Jamaica